Nemaha Valley Schools may refer to:
 Nemaha Central USD 115 (Kansas)
 Nemaha Valley Schools (Nebraska)